Adesmiella cordipicta is a species of beetle in the family Cerambycidae, and the only species in the genus Adesmiella. It was described by Lane in 1959.

References

Hemilophini
Beetles described in 1959